Výborný (feminine Výborná) is a Czech surname. Notable people with the surname include:

 Anatoly Vyborny (born 1965), Russian politician
 David Výborný (born 1975), Czech ice hockey player
 Marek Výborný (born 1976), Czech politician
 Martin Výborný, Slovak ice hockey player
 Miloslav Výborný (born 1952), Czech politician
 Richard Výborný (born 1971), Czech table tennis player

See also
 

Czech-language surnames